Di Ying (born 21 April 1962) is a Taiwanese actress best known for her roles in Dou hua nu (1992) and Gatao 2: The New King (2018).

Early life 
Di was born as Lin Miao-Hsi (林妙嬉) in Taiwan on April 21, 1962. Di's mother was an actress and her father died early. Di's uncle Fang Jun is an actor.

Career 
Di kicked Hong Kong actress Yammie Lam in the stomach in public making her fall on the ground when they were co-starring in a Taiwanese TV series in 1991, and Di boasted about it in a variety show in 2005, calling her "Lam the big shot", long after Lam's retirement.

Personal life 
Di was married to Sun Peng in 1998 and the couple divorced in 2004. Di remarried her ex-husband in 2007. The couple has a son named An-Tso "Edward" Sun (孫安佐).

In 2018, Edward Sun threatened to shoot up the Pennsylvania high school where he was enrolled in as an exchange student. He was found to have hundreds of rounds of ammunitions and handgun components that could be assembled into a 9mm handgun. He entered an open guilty plea to terrorist threats in the Delaware County Common Pleas Court, and pleaded guilty to illegally possessing ammunition in federal court.

Filmography

Film

Television

References

External links
 

1962 births
Living people
Taiwanese film actresses
Taiwanese television actresses
Taiwanese Mandopop singers
Taiwanese opera actresses
20th-century Taiwanese actresses
20th-century Taiwanese women singers
21st-century Taiwanese actresses
21st-century Taiwanese women singers